Ahmed Malek, also known as Ahmad Malek, is an Egyptian actor.

Career
Malek starred in Mohamed Diab's Clash, which opened the Un Certain Regard at the 2016 Cannes Film Festival. Other roles include Sheikh Jackson (2017), Hepta: The Last Lecture and La Tottfea El Shams.
 
He had his first English-speaking role (also speaking Dari, Pashto and Badimaya, an Aboriginal Australian language) in the 2020 Australian film The Furnace. For his role he was nominated for the 2021 AACTA Award for Best Actor in a Leading Role.

Malek appeared in the 2022 film The Swimmers, dramatising the lives of Yusra and Sarah Mardini.

References

External links
 
 

Living people
Egyptian male film actors
Egyptian male television actors
1995 births